Sheikhupura District (
),  is a district located in Lahore Division of Punjab Province, Pakistan. Sheikhupura is the headquarters of Sheikhupura district. According to the 1998 census of Pakistan, the district had a population of 3,321,029 of which 25.45% were urban. In 2005 one of its subdivisions was split off to form the new Nankana Sahib District.

The predominant language of the district is Punjabi, which according to the 1998 census results for the tehsils of Sheikhupura, Ferozewala and Safdarabad, is the first language of % of the population, while Urdu is the first language of %.

According to the 2017 Census of Pakistan, most populous cities of the district are Sheikhupura, Muridke, Kot Abdul Malik and Ferozewala. All these four cities are listed in the List of most populous cities in Pakistan.

Tehsils
The district comprises 5 tehsils:
Sheikhupura
Ferozewala
Muridke
Sharaq Pur
Safdarabad (part of Nankana Sahib District between 2005 and 2008)

Committees
List of Municipal Committees in District Sheikhupura

Sheikhupura Municipal Committee
Farooq abad Municipal Committee
Mananwala Municipal Committee
Safdar abad Municipal Committee
Khanqah dogran Municipal Committee
Ferozwala Municipal Committee
Kot Abdulmalik Municipal Committee
Muridke Municipal Committee
Narang Mandi Municipal Committee
Sharaqpur Municipal Committee

Demographics 
At the time of the 2017 census, Sheikhupura district had a population of 3,460,426 of which 1,786,383 were male and 1,673,242 female. 2,258,491 which is 65.26% of the population lives in rural areas while 1,201,513 which is 34.72% of the population lives in urban areas. 97.07% of the population spoke Punjabi, 1.28% Urdu and 1.01% Pashto as their first language. 96.10% of the population was Muslim and 3.77% Christian.

See also 
Sharaqpur Sharif
Hiran Minar
Sheikhupura Fort

References

External links

Sheikhupura District

 
Districts of Punjab, Pakistan